Pomare railway station is an intermediate railway station in Lower Hutt, New Zealand, served by Metlink's electric multiple-unit trains of the "Matangi" FP class, on the Hutt Valley Line section of the Wairarapa Line.

The island platform station between double tracks serves the suburb of Pomare and provides the nearest rail connection for Stokes Valley.

History 
The then Hutt Valley Branch to Waterloo, opened 1927 and extended to Haywards (now called Manor Park) 1946–54, became the main route to Upper Hutt and the Wairarapa from 1 March 1954 with the closing of the Melling-Haywards section. Pomare opened soon after, on 9 August 1954.

In 2010, 42 new "park and ride" parking places were provided at Pomare, particularly for commuters from Stokes Valley.

Services 
The following Metlink bus routes serve Pomare station:

References

External links
 Passenger service timetables from Metlink and Tranz Metro.

Rail transport in Wellington
Buildings and structures in Lower Hutt
Railway stations in New Zealand
Railway stations opened in 1954